Rammam may refer to:
 Rammam Hydro, hydroelectric plant in India
 Ramim-e Shomali, village in Iran